Daniel Briceño may refer to:

 Daniel Briceño (Colombian footballer) (born 1985), Colombian footballer
 Daniel Briceño (Chilean footballer) (born 1982), Chilean footballer